D.A.V. Public School, Gerva is located in Gevra Area of Korba, Chhattisgarh, India. Founded in 1987 by South Eastern Coalfields Limited and D.A.V. College Managing Committee. It is affiliated to the Central Board of Secondary Education, New Delhi and is governed by South Eastern Coalfields Limited.

See also
Education in India
Literacy in India 
List of institutions of higher education in Chhattisgarh

References

External links
 D.A.V. Public School, Gevra – Official Website

Schools affiliated to CBSE
Private schools in Chhattisgarh
Schools affiliated with the Arya Samaj
High schools and secondary schools in Chhattisgarh
Korba district
Educational institutions established in 1987
1987 establishments in Madhya Pradesh